Mariah's Storm (foaled April 1, 1991, in Kentucky) is an American thoroughbred racehorse, bred by Donald T. Johnson's Crescent Farm in Lexington, Kentucky. She suffered a serious injury while racing but later made a full recovery and continued her career.

In 2005, film director John Gatins made a motion picture titled Dreamer: Inspired by a True Story in which the horse "Soñador" is based on Mariah's Storm.

Background 
Mariah's Storm is a very well-bred filly with high racing potential. She was a daughter of Rahy, who also sired 2001 European Horse of the Year Fantastic Light, Noverre, Champion 3-Year-Old in England, U.S. Racing Hall of Fame member Serena's Song and Dreaming of Anna, the 2006 American Champion Two-Year-Old Filly and Breeders' Cup Juvenile Fillies winner. Mariah's Storm's grandsire was the important Blushing Groom, and her damsire was Epsom Derby winner Roberto.

Mariah's Storm was trained by the father and son team of Don Von Hemel and Donnie K. The father won the 1994 Ak-Sar-Ben Oaks and the 1995 Falls City Handicap with her and the son the 1993 Arlington-Washington Lassie Stakes, 1994 Arlington Heights Oaks, and in 1995 the Arlington Matron Handicap and the Turfway Park Budweiser Breeders' Cup Stakes.

In 1993, Mariah's Storm was working on building points to qualify for a chance to run in that fall's Breeders' Cup when she fractured her front left cannon bone while running in the Alcibiades Stakes at Keeneland Race Course. When a horse injures her cannon bone, it usually ends her racing career. However, Mariah's Storm's owners and trainers refused to give up hope and with the work of several skilled veterinarians, the fractured cannon bone healed and strengthened.

Full recovery
In September 1993, before the injury occurred, Mariah's Storm won the Arlington-Washington Lassie Stakes at Chicago's Arlington Park. This was a Grade III stakes for two-year-old-fillies. After her injury healed and she fully recovered, she made a return to racing in 1994 and won the Arlington Oaks. In 1995, she won the Arlington Matron Stakes. Since her record of winning all three stakes races at Arlington Park was a rare accomplishment, Arlington officials named the Mariah's Storm Stakes in her honor.

Racing at age four, in September 1995 Mariah's Storm won the Turfway Breeders' Cup Stakes at Turfway Park, defeating future U.S. Racing Hall of Fame filly Serena's Song, also a daughter of Rahy. She then won the Falls City Handicap at Churchill Downs and competed in the Breeders' Cup Distaff, where she finished ninth in a ten-horse field.

Produce record
Mariah's Storm made her mark on the racing industry as a broodmare, producing the great Giant's Causeway (by Storm Cat), the European Horse of the Year for 2000. She also produced Freud, a full brother to Giant's Causeway who stands at Sequel Stallions New York. Freud was the leading sire in New York in 2008. She has also produced significant mares: her first filly, a full sister to Giant's Causeway named You'resothrilling, produced four-time Group 1 winner Gleneagles and Irish 1,000 Guineas winner Marvellous. Mariah's Storm also produced a Sadler's Wells filly named Love Me Only that is the dam of Storm the Stars (by Sea the Stars), winner of the Group 2 Great Voltigeur Stakes and placed in multiple Group 1 races.  Mariah's Storm produced six colts in a row from 1997 to 2002, followed by seven fillies from 2005 to 2015.

In the media
The 2005 film Dreamer was loosely based on the story of Mariah's Storm. However, in the movie, Soñador (the horse based on Mariah's Storm) won the Breeders' Cup Classic (as the fifth filly ever to participate in that race), whereas in real life, Mariah's Storm ran in the Breeders' Cup Distaff and finished ninth of ten.

Pedigree

See also
Dreamer: Inspired by a True Story
 Giant's Causeway (horse)

References 

1991 racehorse births
Racehorses bred in Kentucky
Racehorses trained in the United States
Thoroughbred family 11